James Coulter may refer to:

 James Coulter (Doctors), a fictional character from Doctors
 James Coulter (financier) (born 1959), private equity investor
 James Coulter (American football), head football coach